"Rock My Baby" is a song written by Curtis Wright, Billy Spencer and Phil Whitley, and recorded by American country music group Shenandoah.  It was released in March 1992 as the first single from their album Long Time Comin'.  The song reached number two on the Billboard Hot Country Singles & Tracks chart in July, 1992, and peaked at number four in Canada.

Music video
The music video was directed by Dale Heslip and premiered in early 1992.

Chart performance
"Rock My Baby" debuted on the U.S. Billboard Hot Country Singles & Tracks for the week of April 4, 1992.

Year-end charts

References

1992 singles
Shenandoah (band) songs
Songs written by Curtis Wright
Song recordings produced by Keith Stegall
RCA Records singles
1992 songs